The military history of the Three Kingdoms period encompasses roughly a century's worth of prolonged warfare and disorder in Chinese history. After the assassination of General-in-chief He Jin in September 189, the administrative structures of the Han government became increasingly irrelevant. By the time of death of Cao Cao, the most successful warlord of North China, in 220, the Han empire was divided between the three rival states of Cao Wei, Shu Han and Eastern Wu. Due to the ensuing turmoil, the competing powers of the Three Kingdoms era found no shortage of willing recruits for their armies, although press-ganging as well as forcible enlistment of prisoners from defeated armies still occurred. Following four centuries of rule under the Han dynasty, the Three Kingdoms brought about a new era of conflict in China that shifted institutions in favor of a more permanent and selective system of military recruitment. This ultimately included the creation of a hereditary military class as well as increasing reliance on non-Chinese cavalry forces and the end of universal conscription.

Organization

Recruitment and organization
As the Han dynasty fell into disarray after the Yellow Turban Rebellion, its system of conscription and checks on military leadership broke down, giving local leaders the autonomy to recruit their own personal armies. At the heart of each army was a group of trusted Companions (親近 qinjin) consisting of family members, close friends and clansmen hired by whatever means was available to their lord. Cao Cao's earliest commanders who formed the nucleus of his army were all clansmen (Cao Xiu, Cao Zhen, Cao Chun). There was no need for conscription as the conflicts of the late Han dynasty created willing recruits who sought protection under a strong army. This type of soldier, characterized by a lack of loyalty to state or nation, primarily concerned with survival, made up the majority of the army outside of the leader's close following. Due to the lack of loyalty among common troops, acts of heroism and courage were particularly emphasized among commanders who were expected to lead from the front. A typical example of this type of commander would be Dian Wei, a former local bully noted for his great strength, appetite, and his choice of weaponry, two halberds of immense weight, who served under Cao Cao. In 195, he personally led a group of volunteers clad in double armour (兩鎧 liang kai) against Lü Bu's forces while his liege made his escape. He was promoted to colonel of the bodyguard unit known as the Tiger Warriors and later met his death against Zhang Xiu in 197. While echoes of Han organization continued through the formal titles of military structure, in effect the wars of the Three Kingdoms were fought between armies of bands led by individuals selected by dint of violence and charisma.

Training
Military training programs for the general populace in the inner provinces were mostly discontinued after 30 AD to reduce the risk of rebellion. The total number of professional soldiers in standing armies in the Eastern Han, including all the smaller groups, amounted to approximately 20,000 soldiers. Expeditions and campaigns relied upon tens of thousands of troops from local militia armies and non-Chinese auxiliaries, supplemented by professional and semi-professional troops.  The men in the inner provinces of the empire could be called to serve during emergencies or serve in local militias to fight against bandits, but these men received no formal training or regular exercise. On the other hand, men of the frontier provinces were liable for conscription and military service as before.  This had a negative impact on the performance of the Han army, as noted by Ying Shao, who remarked that "sending [such] men into battle without training is just throwing them away". The majority of soldiers recruited during the early stages of the Three Kingdoms period were thus "neither disciplined nor well trained in the use of arms". Formations and drill still existed, but these were the exceptions rather than the norm, and there is no evidence of troops engaging in a regular training system or large scale exercises. Most commanders favored simple rather than complex formations and maneuvers. An example of a formation that did exist is Zhuge Liang's Eight Formation Plan, which included different configurations named after Heaven, Earth, Wind, and Clouds. It is not clear what these designations mean, but the Eight Formation Plan was traditionally a square formation composed of nine divisions in three sections. The lack of training severely constrained the kind of orders a commander could give for his troops to follow. As a consequence of the limited tactical flexibility at their disposal, the majority of battles were carried out in one of two ways: a head on charge by elite shock troops followed by the loosely organized army of incoherent and disparately trained and equipped soldiers, or ambush and surprise the enemy before they could even respond and cause them to route.

The training that the privileged elite received was far greater in extent compared to that of the common soldier. For example, Cao Cao's son, Cao Pi, started his military education in early childhood. He began training in archery at the age of five, started learning how to ride a horse at the age of six, and could both ride and shoot a target at a hundred paces by the time he was eight. Horse archery was also practiced in Shu Han, which fielded a "Flying Army" of mounted archers.

Hereditary troops
In contrast to the military hierarchy of the Han dynasty, leadership of a unit in the Three Kingdoms was functionally hereditary as long as the successor was loyal to his liege and proved militarily competent. When the commander died, a male member of his family inherited control of his troops, and when a soldier died one of his male relatives inherited his position in the unit. By the end of the Three Kingdoms, the term buqu (部曲) had come to designate the institution of hereditary military leadership. Both bu and qu, meaning battalions and companies, were originally units of military organization during the Han. Under Cao Cao, a more systematic form of hereditary soldiery was implemented through "military families" (士家 shijia) which later became "hereditary troops" (世兵 shibing). As their name implies, able male members born into military families served for life, and when they could no longer serve because of illness or death, their sons or close family members replaced them. Their families lived at the capital and other major centers where they could be used by the government as hostages to ensure the loyalty of their soldiers. They were also forbidden from marrying into non-military families in order to prevent their offspring from exiting the system, thus creating a closed community of military households. Although commoners could still be called up in times of urgent need, the rise of government mandated military communities under Cao Wei and the demobilization of local levies under the Jin dynasty, had by and large, replaced the universal conscription of the Han.

Tuntian
Tuntian, often rendered as "[military] agricultural colonies," were self-sustaining farming communities created for the purpose of providing food for the military. Generally consisting of displaced peoples, refugees, and bandits, tenants of a tuntian were expected to protect themselves in times of emergencies and in return were exempt from corvée labour. Unlike the tuntian system of the Han dynasty, which was generally hands off, the tuntian policy of the Three Kingdoms era was to directly provide them with supplies and material assistance. The policy of tuntian was implemented primarily by Cao Cao, Tao Qian, and Gongsun Zan.

Equipment

Armies of the Three Kingdoms era used largely the same equipment as the Han dynasty since it directly follows the end of the Han. There were however some minor differences and developments such as the increasing prevalence of armoured cavalry. In one battle, the warlord Cao Cao boasted that with only ten sets of horse armour he had faced an enemy with three hundred sets. The horse armour may however have just been partial frontal barding. Mounting stirrups were already in use, possibly as early as the Han dynasty, but full riding stirrups would not appear until the 4th century. References to "dark armour" (xuan kai or xuan jia 玄鎧/玄甲) and "brilliant armour" also began to appear in the 3rd century. This is probably in reference to the association of high quality steel with black ferrous material.

Weapons were largely the same as well, although there was more focus on idiosyncratic weapons wielded by particularly noteworthy individuals. For example, one man named Chen An apparently wielded a great sword over two meters in length and Sun Quan's wife had over a hundred female attendants armed with daos. Trends in warfare that had already been underway during the Eastern Han continued to gain momentum. By the end of the Three Kingdoms, the single edged dao, with its thicker and more durable dull side, had overtaken the straight double-edged jian as the primary close combat weapon. The more expensive, lighter, and less durable jian entered the domain of court dancers, officials, and expert warriors. While halberds were still used during the period, long spears and lances (similar to pikes) re-rose in prominence over halberds for infantry and cavalry forces. This was believed to have been the result of the long spear and lances' simpler construction, the adoption of long spears and lances by heavy cavalry to strike infantrymen, and the adoption of tighter infantry formations with less room for swinging and hooking [of halberds] in response to the greater threat by cavalry.  Soldiers in the northeast specialized in long spears. After the Han dynasty, the crossbow gradually faded in importance until it made a mild resurgence during the Tang dynasty, under which the ideal expeditionary army of 20,000 included 2,200 archers and 2,000 crossbowmen.

References to "great shields" occur in their usage on the front line to protect spearmen and crossbowmen. Shields were also commonly paired with the single edged dao and used among cavalrymen. Descriptions of the Battle of Guandu mention that Cao Cao's soldiers employed shield cover above their heads each time they moved out into the open due to oppressive arrow fire from Yuan Shao's wooden towers.

Although Zhuge Liang is often credited with the invention of the repeating crossbow, this is actually due to a mistranslation confusing it with the multiple bolt crossbow. The source actually says Zhuge invented a multiple bolt crossbow that could shoot ten iron bolts simultaneously, each 20 cm long.

Dark armour
A report in 231 AD mentions the capture of 5,000 suits of "dark armour" (xuan kai or xuan jia 玄鎧/玄甲) and 3,100 crossbows. Dark armour appears in Han texts as well, but only as the attire worn by honor guards at funeral processions. The only known trait about dark armour is that it reflected the sun's rays. This probably means dark armour was made of high quality steel, which was often associated with black ferrous material.

Brilliant armour
Cao Zhi mentioned three different kinds of armour, two of which were variants of "brilliant" armour:

Brilliant armour was made of decarburized steel, which shines blue-black when polished, giving it its name. Chen Lin described brilliant armour in the following manner:

Wheel catapult
Ma Jun, a military engineer serving under Cao Wei, devised a siege weapon which threw large stones using a wheel. This device consisted of a drum wheel attached with a curved knife. When rotated, the stones which hung on the wheel would be cut loose by the knife and launched. It is not clear how well this device worked in practice. Successful tests with roof tiles instead of stones are mentioned, but according to Liang Jieming, this contraption never made it past the testing phase and could not have been possible with the technology available at the time.

Special weapons
The historical novel Romance of the Three Kingdoms attributes a number of fictional weapons, often with special names, to certain individuals. Examples include Liu Bei's "Paired Winding Swords" (雙股劍), Guan Yu's "Green Dragon Crescent Blade" (青龍偃月刀), Zhang Fei's "Eighteen chi Serpent Lance" (丈八蛇矛), Zhao Yun's "Blue Steel Sword" (青釭劍), Cao Cao's "Sword of Heaven" (倚天劍), Sun Jian's "Ancient Ingot Blade" (古錠刀), Cheng Pu's "Ironspine Serpent Lance" (鐵脊蛇矛), and Lü Bu's "Fangtianhua Ji" (方天畫戟), otherwise known as the "Sky Piercer" or "Sky Piercing Halberd". While these are completely fictional, the Records of the Three Kingdoms do mention weapons unique to individuals on at least two occasions: Dian Wei's double halberd which weighed 20 kg and Gongsun Zan's two-bladed spear.

Single combat
The Records of the Three Kingdoms and Annotations to Records of the Three Kingdoms contain two instances of single combat between generals. In 192, after Dong Zhuo had been murdered, Li Jue and Guo Si formed an army to oust Wang Yun and Lü Bu from Chang'an. When Guo Si approached the city from the north, Lü Bu opened the gate and offered to settle the matter by single combat. Guo Si agreed and engaged with Lü Bu, who pierced Guo Si with his lance. Guo Si's men came forth, saving their general, and both sides withdrew. Another instance of individual combat occurred between Taishi Ci, then serving under Liu Yao, and Sun Ce. Taishi Ci was on a mission accompanied by only a single horseman when he met Sun Ce, who had 13 other men with him. Taishi Ci charged at Sun Ce and the two sides clashed in single combat. Sun Ce pierced Taishi's horse and managed to grab hold of his halberd while Taishi removed Sun's helmet. When their respective reinforcements showed up, they disengaged and the duel came to an end.

Combat between generals and officers during battle is also mentioned by the Records. In 197 Yan Xing, an officer of Han Sui, engaged with Ma Chao and nearly killed him when his spear broke and pierced Ma Chao's neck. In 200 Yan Liang, a general of Yuan Shao, was slain by Guan Yu, then serving under Cao Cao, during the Battle of Boma. In 214 Zhang Liao charged Sun Quan's army with only 800 men and reportedly killed ten soldiers and two officers. He then broke through the enemy ramparts and challenged Sun Quan to a duel, to which he declined.

Three Kingdoms

Cao Wei

Cao Wei was founded by Cao Pi in 220 and was usurped by Sima Yan's Jin dynasty in 266.

Cao Cao

Cao Cao was the son of Cao Song, whose original surname was Xiahou but took the name of Cao as a child when he was adopted by the eunuch Cao Teng. During his childhood Cao Cao studied the Art of War and was fond of hawking and hunting with dogs. He was also considered a troublemaker and local thug in his town. At one point in his youth, Cao Cao and Yuan Shao raided a wedding. Cao Cao kidnapped the bride and directed the pursuers toward Yuan Shao. Xu Shao foretold that Cao Cao would be "a good servant in time of peace, a dangerous chieftain in time of trouble".

In the 170s Cao Cao became a chief of police in Luoyang and made a name for himself as a strict enforcer of the law. He was eventually implicated and dismissed from his post in 178.

Cao Cao took part in suppressing the Yellow Turban rebellion in 184 as a Commandant of Cavalry. He was then appointed Chancellor of Jinan Commandery, where he set about removing officials under the influence of the imperial family. Cao Cao became afraid of the enemies he had made at court so he left his post.

In 188 Cao Cao became a colonel of the Western Garden. When Dong Zhuo seized power in 189, Cao Cao fled to Chenliu Commandery, where he sold his family estates and raised troops to join Yuan Shao and the Campaign against Dong Zhuo. Irritated by Yuan Shao's lack of action, Cao Cao advanced into He'nan Commandery only to suffer defeat at the Battle of Xingyang.

Cao Cao raised more troops in Yang Province. In 191 he became Administrator of Dong Commandery for defeating the bandit chieftain Bo Rao. When Liu Dai, the Inspector of Yan Province, died in 192 while dealing with the Yellow Turbans from Qing Province, Cao Cao succeeded him. By the end of the year Cao Cao had negotiated the surrender of the rebels, who augmented his army with 30,000 additional soldiers, known collectively as the Qingzhou Troops (青州兵).

In 193 Cao Cao drove away Yuan Shu to the south. At this time however, his father Cao Song and brother Cao De were killed by some of the rogue troops of Tao Qian, the Governor of Xu Province. Cao Cao invaded Xu Province in retaliation massacring hundreds of thousands of civilians on his first campaign, but in 194 while on his second campaign against Tao Qian his former friend Zhang Miao raised the flag of rebellion in Yan Province. With the aid of Lü Bu, the rebels dealt several defeats to Cao Cao, taking most of the province. Eventually the tide turned on them and Cao Cao regained his territories. Zhang Miao's family was destroyed while Lü Bu fled to Xu Province.

In 196 Cao Cao took control of the imperial court and moved it to Xu city. In 197 Cao Cao came into conflict with Zhang Xiu and Liu Biao. However he retreated due to news of a potential raid by Yuan Shao. In 198 Liu Bei took refuge with Cao Cao and requested his aid against Lü Bu. Cao Cao laid siege to Lü Bu in Xiapi Commandery and killed him that winter, taking control of Xu Province. Liu Bei rebelled and was driven away. Yuan Shao crossed the Yellow River with a large army in the spring of 200 but was too slow to mobilize. In the winter Cao Cao led a raiding party behind enemy lines and destroyed their supply train at the Battle of Guandu, causing Yuan Shao's army to disintegrate. Meanwhile, Liu Bei had been making trouble in Ru'nan Commandery with the bandit Gong Du. With Yuan Shao no longer posing a threat, Cao Cao returned to deal with Liu Bei, driving him away to take refuge with Liu Biao.

In the summer of 202, Yuan Shao died, leaving his territory to his sons. They fought among themselves and fell prey to Cao Cao's advances. By 205 he had ousted Yuan Tan and Yuan Shang from their southern territories. Over the next two years he brought Ji Province and southern Bing Province under his control. In the summer of 207 Cao Cao made a roundabout trip north and defeated the Wuhuan at the Battle of White Wolf Mountain. They fled to Gongsun Kang in Liaodong Commandery, but he beheaded them and delivered their heads to Cao Cao.

As Cao Cao prepared to campaign south in 208, Liu Biao died. His son Liu Zong surrendered while Liu Bei fled further south. Cao Cao followed and defeated Liu Bei at the Battle of Changban. Seizing the naval base at Jiangling, Cao Cao moved his new river fleet downstream. His confrontation with Liu Bei and the Sun Quan's general Zhou Yu culminated in defeat and the destruction of his fleet at the Battle of Red Cliffs. Failing to cross the Changjiang, Cao Cao retreated north.

In 211 Cao Cao moved west against Zhang Lu and in doing so also drew the ire of Ma Chao and Han Sui. They were outmaneuvered and defeated at the Battle of Tong Pass. In 212 Cao Cao left Xiahou Yuan behind to continue the northwestern campaign while he returned east to attack Sun Quan across the Huai River. The invasion force reached the banks of the Changjiang but failed to break the enemy defenses. Cao Cao returned to Ye City in 213.

In 215 Cao Cao eliminated Zhang Lu and occupied Hanzhong Commandery. Cao Cao attacked Sun Quan again in 217 after Sun Quan's failed attack in 215. However he was never able to make it past the Changjiang defenses but was able to gain Sun Quan's nominal surrender. In the spring of 219, his general Xiahou Yuan was killed at the Battle of Mount Dingjun and Cao Cao lost his position in Hanzhong Commandery. Liu Bei's general Guan Yu also defeated Yu Jin's fores in Nanyang Commandery and laid siege to Cao Ren in Fancheng. However he was unable to take the city and was himself killed when Sun Quan's general Lü Meng who took advantage of the situation and attacked him from behind. Cao Cao died soon afterward on 15 March, 220. He was succeeded by his son Cao Pi.

Although primarily known as a military leader, Cao Cao also compiled a commentary on the Art of War and was a renowned poet and player of the game of weiqi. His two most famous poems, Though the Tortoise Lives Long and Short Song Style were written during and right before the battles of White Wolf Mountain and Red Cliff.

Later history

On 11 December, 220, Cao Pi deposed the last Han emperor and proclaimed himself Emperor of Cao Wei. During his reign Cao Pi alienated his brothers Cao Zhang and Cao Zhi. Cao Pi deeply distrusted his close kin and reduced their powers out of suspicion of their loyalty. Cao Pi died in 226 and was succeeded by his son Cao Rui. Although Cao Rui was twenty years old, he was nonetheless appointed a regency council by his father prior to his death. By 236, three members of the regency council had died, leaving Sima Yi as the primary leader of Cao Wei. Before this time, Shu Han launch attacks on the Wei borders and in 229, Zhuge Liang occupied Wudu Commandery. He was, however, unable to make any further gains during his battles against Sima Yi and died in 234.  In 238 Sima Yi annexed the Gongsun state in the northwest. This was followed by a campaign into Goguryeo in 244 and 245. Cao Rui died in 239 and was succeeded by his adopted son Cao Fang, who fell under the regency of Cao Shuang and Sima Yi.

In 249 Sima Yi killed Cao Shuang and seized power in Wei. He died two years later and was succeeded by his son Sima Shi. Cao Fang tried to retake power for himself in 254 but failed and was replaced by his cousin, Cao Mao. Sima Shi died in 255 and was succeeded by his brother Sima Zhao. In 260 Cao Mao, like his cousin, attempted to seize control of the state, but failed and died in the process. In 264 Sima Zhao conquered Shu Han, eliminating one of the Three Kingdoms. He died the following year and was succeeded by his son Sima Yan. On 8 February 266, Sima Yan deposed the last emperor of Wei, Cao Huan, and proclaimed himself Emperor of the Jin dynasty.

Sima Yan went on to annex the southern state of Eastern Wu in 280, putting an end to the period of the Three Kingdoms.

Shu Han

Shu Han was founded by Liu Bei in 221 and was conquered by Cao Wei in 263.

Liu Bei

Liu Bei was a very distant descendant of Emperor Jing of Han. His father Liu Hong died when he was still very young and his mother made a living by selling straw sandals. In 175 Liu Bei was sent to study at the Taixue of Luoyang, where he became friends with Gongsun Zan. Liu Bei had very little interest in books but had a knack for fighting and inspired many young men to join him. With the support of two merchants, Zhang Shiping and Su Shuang, Liu Bei was able to create a sizable following including his long time friends Guan Yu and Zhang Fei. When the Yellow Turban Rebellion broke out in 184 Liu Bei led his troops against them under various commanders. He did well in both campaigns but was only rewarded with a very low position in the imperial service. He abandoned his post when an officer tried to reduce his position and joined Guanqiu Yi on an expedition against rebels in Danyang Commandery. For his service in that expedition he was rewarded with the post of assistant magistrate in a county in Pingyuan Commandery. When the anti-Dong Zhuo coalition formed, Liu Bei raised troops in their service, but soon afterwards left to join his friend Gongsun Zan in the north.

Liu Bei assisted Gongsun Zan against his rival Yuan Shao in 191 and was given the post of magistrate in Pingyuan Commandery. His post didn't last long as Yuan Shao dealt a devastating blow to Gongsun Zan in 192 and Liu Bei was forced to move east to Qi Commandery. When Tao Qian of Xu Province offered him 4,000 troops and a post in Pei Commandery, Liu Bei accepted. Tao Qian died in 194 and Liu Bei succeeded him as Governor of Xu Province. In 196 Yuan Shu invaded from the south and fought Liu Bei for a month at a stalemate. During this time however, Liu Bei had lost Xiapi Commandery due to Zhang Fei killing its Chancellor allowing Lü Bu, who was at the time taking refuge in the province, to attack Liu Bei and forced him to surrender. Having defeated Liu Bei and taken control of Xu Province, Lü Bu drove away Yuan Shu's army. Though he was defeated, Liu Bei still retained Pei Commandery. When Yuan Shu attacked Liu Bei again, Lü Bu prevented his advance out of fear that Yuan Shu would become too powerful. Liu Bei continued to recruit troops until 198 when he intercepted a trade convoy from Lü Bu. Lü Bu's officers Gao Shun and Zhang Liao retaliated, taking Pei Commandery and forcing Liu Bei to flee to Cao Cao. Cao Cao sent an army under Xiahou Dun to assist Liu Bei against Lü Bu. In the autumn their army was defeated by Gao Shun. When Cao Cao joined them in the winter, they successfully laid siege to Lü Bu in Xiapi Commandery and killed him the following year.

In 199 Liu Bei was sent to intercept Yuan Shu from making contact with Yuan Shao. When Liu Bei reached Xu Province, he rebelled, killing the Inspector Che Zhou. Cao Cao's initial attempt to suppress him ended in failure but the second one in 200 succeeded. Liu Bei abandoned his family and Guan Yu, who were captured, and fled to Yuan Shao in Qing Province. He was sent to Ru'nan Commandery to assist the bandit Gong Du but suffered defeat at the hands of Cao Cao's officer Cao Ren.He was however able to defeat and kill Cao Cao's officer Cai Yang. Yuan Shao's army was defeated in 200 at the Battle of Guandu and Liu Bei was forced to take refuge with Liu Biao in Jing Province.

Stationed on the northern frontier of Jing Province, in 202 Liu Bei achieved victory against Xiahou Dun and Yu Jin at the Battle of Bowang. After that Cao Cao became preoccupied with the north while Liu Bei was recalled to court. During his stay with Liu Biao, Liu Bei recruited Zhuge Liang, who would later become the leading military figure of Shu Han. In the autumn of 208 Liu Biao died and Cao Cao moved to invade. Liu Biao's son Liu Zong chose to surrender. Liu Bei led his followers south to the Changjiang where they were heavily defeated by Cao Cao at the Battle of Changban in Nan Commandery. While Cao Cao occupied the naval base at Jiangling, Liu Bei retreated to the southeast towards Xiakou, and Zhou Yu, general of Sun Quan to the east, came upriver with a sizable army. Having augmented his main army with Jing Province's fleet, Cao Cao continued his advance in the winter against Zhou Yu and Liu Bei's forces arrayed on the east bank of the Changjiang. Despite his superior numbers, Cao Cao was defeated at the Battle of Red Cliffs and his fleet was destroyed by a deployment of fire ships by Sun Quan's officer, Huang Gai. In the winter of 208-209 Liu Bei has conquered most of southern Jing while Zhou Yu had captured Jiangling thus ending any hope Cao Cao had of obtaining area across the Changjiang.

After Liu Qi died in 208, Liu Bei became the Governor of Jing Province. Zhou Yu died in 210 and his successor Lu Su convinced Sun Quan to "lend"(give) Liu Bei Nan Commandery. In 211 Liu Zhang invited Liu Bei to Yi Province as an ally. In 212 Liu Bei betrayed Liu Zhang and attacked him, waging a two-year war that ended in Liu Zhang's surrender and Liu Bei's conquest of Yi Province. In 215 Sun Quan demanded that Liu Bei give him all of southern Jing Province that Liu Bei had obtained. When Liu Bei denied his demands, Sun Quan sent an invasion force commanded by Lü Meng and Lu Su and Liu Bei sent Guan Yu to confront the two in response while he gathers troops for an inevitable battle. A settlement was eventual reached, dividing southern Jing along the Xiang River. In 217 Liu Bei invaded Hanzhong Commandery, which was then under the control of Cao Cao, and solidified his gains in 219 by achieving a decisive victory over the Cao army and killing Xiahou Yuan.

In the autumn of 219, Liu Bei proclaimed himself King of Hanzhong at a coronation ceremony in Mianyang, and established a court in Chengdu. Liu Bei's general, Guan Yu, besieged Fan city, in modern Xiangfan, but Cao Cao's cousin Cao Ren held out and Cao Cao's officer Xu Huang came to his rescue and drove Guan Yu away from Fan Castle. In the winter while Guan Yu was fighting against Cao Ren an offensive by Lü Meng into Nan Commandery ruined Guan Yu's position and he was killed by Lu Meng upon his capture. Sun Quan thus had seized all of Jing Province.

On 15 May 221, Liu Bei proclaimed himself emperor. He then attacked Sun Quan through the Three Gorges and into the middle Changjiang. The following year Lu Xun destroyed Liu Bei's line of camps and forced him to retreat to Baidi Castle with heavy losses. Liu Bei fell ill soon after the battle and upon Sun Quan being under attack by the forces of Cao Pi the two reformed their alliance. Liu Bei died in the summer of 223 and was succeeded by his son Liu Shan, though the government was effectively under the control of Zhuge Liang as a part of Liu Bei's dying request.

Liu Shan
Liu Shan was only 17 years old when his father died and lacked the ability to lead so Zhuge Liang became de facto head of state. In 224 and 225 Zhuge Liang embarked on a Southern Campaign which brought at least nominal submission from chieftains in the south of Yi Province. In the north Zhuge Liang made several attempts to break through the Qinling range, managing to occupy Wudu Commandery in 229. However he was unable to press farther north in his conflicts with Sima Yi and died in 234. Unlike the Sun and Cao regimes, Shu Han never managed to create anything more than an ad hoc warlord regime, probably because its leaders were not native to the region. In 264 Shu Han was conquered by Sima Zhao, the de facto ruler of Cao Wei, whose son Sima Yan would go on to depose the Cao sovereign on 8 February 266, and proclaim himself emperor of the Jin dynasty.

Eastern Wu

Eastern Wu, also known as Sun Wu, was founded by Sun Quan in 229 and was conquered by the Jin dynasty in 280.

Sun Jian
The twins Sun Jian and Sun Qiang were born in 155 AD to an undistinguished merchant family based in the county of Fuchun, Wu Commandery, Yang province. Although his family was of no great importance, they were purportedly descendants of the military strategist Sun Zi, who is traditionally credited with the authorship of The Art of War. Whether the claimed ancestry is true or not, Sun Jian's family played little role in the affairs of the Han dynasty, and next to nothing is known about Sun Jian's obscure lineage.

As a youth, Sun Jian was described as unusual in appearance, kind, intelligent, but fond of odd behavior. At the young age of 16 he was appointed a junior civil officer in the county administration. Sun Jian first made a name for himself at the age of 17 when he went on a trip with his father to Qiantang. During the trip they heard of a band of pirates led by Hu Yu robbing nearby travelers. Sun Jian wanted to attack them while his father wanted nothing to do with the pirates. Even so, Sun Jian set out to confront the pirates. He climbed onto a hill overlooking their camp and waved his sword as if directing soldiers to attack. The pirates thought Sun Jian was part of a government force so they fled. Sun Jian chased after them and took one head as proof of his success. Thereafter, he was promoted to Commandant.

In 172, Sun Jian was appointed Major of troops in Wu Commandery to put down Xu Chang's rebellion in Kuaiji Commandery. Sun Jian's success against the rebels drew the attention of Zang Min, who was in overall command of local forces. With Zang Min's recommendation, Sun Jian became Assistant in the county of Yandu, Guangling Commandery. For the next ten years he remained an official in Xu Province, where he gained a sizable following, and was well liked by those around him:

When the Yellow Turban Rebellion broke out in 184, Sun Jian was called up by Zhu Jun in Kuaiji Commandery, and appointed Associate Major. None could stand against him. Sun Jian constantly led at the forefront of his troops, being the first to scale the walls of Wancheng, dealing the last great blow to the Yellow Turbans. After the Yellow Turbans' defeat, Sun Jian was transferred over to the west to deal with the Liang Province rebellion. During his time there, he came to butt heads with Dong Zhuo, who felt that Sun Jian was a good commander but lacked quality troops.

In 186, Sun Jian returned to the capital and in 187 was promoted to Grand Administrator of Changsha Commandery. As Grand Administrator, Sun Jian destroyed the local rebels Ou Xing, Zhou Chao, and Guo Shi, even aiding neighboring commanderies, much to the consternation of his clerical officers:

For his service in defeating the rebels, Sun Jian was enfeoffed as Marquis of Wucheng, the highest noble rank attainable for a man outside of the imperial family.

When Dong Zhuo seized power at Luoyang in 189, Sun Jian joined Yuan Shu and the anti-Dong Zhuo coalition. When Sun Jian passed by Jing Province, he killed its Inspector Wang Rui as well as the Administrator of Nanyang Commandery, Zhang Zhi, and took over their troops. Sun Jian took the lead in the allied offensive but was defeated by Xu Rong in 191. After recovering from his losses, Sun Jian defeated Hu Zhen and captured the capital of Luoyang. Defending the devastated city however was unfeasible, so he retreated with the Imperial Seal in tow, and passed it down to Yuan Shu. While Sun Jian was attacking Luoyang, the alliance had already broken up, and Yuan Shao's general Zhou Yu (Renming) attacked his base camp. Sun Jian returned and drove back Zhou Yu's army. Yuan Shu then sent him against Liu Biao in Jing Province, where Sun Jian died at the age of 37 in a skirmish near Xiangyang.

Sun Ce

Sun Ce, son of Sun Jian, was 16 years old when his father died. His cousin, Sun Ben, whose father Sun Qiang had died in 175, took over his personal following and served under Yuan Shu. When Yuan Shu was driven to Jiujiang Commandery in 193, Sun Ce was given commission and sent south with some of his father's former troops. Sun Ce was defeated by Zu Lang and returned north the following year. He was granted another thousand troops and sent to take Lujiang Commandery from Lu Kang. Although successful in his endeavor, he was not promoted as was promised by Yuan Shu. In 195 he was sent against Liu Yao in Yang Province. Sun Ce quickly took over the region and pushed Liu Yao to Yuzhang Commandery. By 197 when Yuan Shao declared himself emperor, Sun Ce had become the dominant power in Yang Province, so he rejected his former allegiance and allied himself to Cao Cao. In 198 Sun Ce invaded Lujiang Commandery and defeated Liu Xun and Huang Zu. In 200 the Administrator of Yuzhang Commandery surrendered. At this point Yan Baihu and Xu Gong rebelled, so Sun Ce returned east, killing Xu Gong. Before he could deal with Yan Baihu however, Sun Ce was ambushed and killed by Xu Gong's retainers. He was 26 at the time of death.

Sun Quan

Sun Quan succeeded his elder brother and spent the next two years studying. In 203 Sun Quan attacked and destroyed Huang Zu's fleet. In 204 he dealt with a rebellion in Danyang Commandery which killed his brother Sun Yi. In 205 his officer He Qi began expanding into modern Fujian and by 208 a full commandery had been created in the area. The attack on Huang Zu renewed in 207 and Sun Quan's forces successfully defeated and killed him in 208 at the Battle of Jiangxia.

Liu Biao died that year and his son Liu Zong surrendered to Cao Cao. As Liu Bei and Liu Qi fled south, Cao Cao requested Sun Quan's support, but Sun Quan decided to resist the northern encroachment instead and sent his generals Zhou Yu and Cheng Pu to support Liu Bei's cohort. Despite Cao Cao's overwhelming numerical superiority, his forces failed to cross the Changjiang and were defeated at the Battle of Red Cliff by an attack of fire ships from Sun Quan's officer Huang Gai. Cao Ren managed to hold onto Jiangling for another year before retreating north.

Liu Qi died soon afterwards and Jing Province was split between Liu Bei and Sun Quan. While Sun Quan's forces were preparing to launch an invasion of Yi Province ruled by Liu Zhang, his general Zhou Yu fell ill and died in 209. Zhou Yu's successor Lu Su convinced Sun Quan to let Liu Bei "borrow" Nan Commandery in order to stabilize the situation on the western frontier. Meanwhile, Sun Quan established his capital at Jianye, in modern Nanjing. Sun Quan's attempts to capture territory north of the Changjiang ended in failure both in 208 and in 215. However, when he demanded the "return" of Nan Commandery from Liu Bei in 215, and was denied, Sun Quan moved west and occupied the commanderies of Jiangxia, Changsha, and Guiyang.

In 217 Cao Cao made a major attack on the south. Despite failing to achieve any real gains, Cao Cao stationed a substantial army in the area, threatening Sun Quan's territory forcing Sun Quan to act as a figurative subordinate to Cao Cao. In 219 Sun Quan's general Lü Meng attacked Guan Yu's position in Jing Province on advice from Sima Yi during Guan Yu's attack on Fan Castle. Guan Yu was caught off guard and killed while the whole province fell under Sun Quan's control. Liu Bei retaliated in 221 but failed to make any headway and the invasion was defeated by Sun Quan's general Lu Xun. In 226 Sun Quan launched attacks towards the south and annexed Jiaozhou. In 229, Sun Quan declared himself emperor of Eastern Wu, creating the last of the Three Kingdoms.

For the next 20 years, Sun Quan conducted several military campaigns in the north as well as an expedition to Taiwan in 230, but nothing ever came of these ventures. Noted for his longevity, Sun Quan was nevertheless unsuccessful as a military commander in comparison to his peers Liu Bei and Cao Cao. He died in 252 and was succeeded by his son Sun Liang.

Demise
After the death of Sun Quan, the dynasty became paralyzed by infighting. Sun Liang assassinated his guardian Zhuge Ke under the influence of a distant relative Sun Jun. When Sun Jun died in 256, he was succeeded by his cousin Sun Lin. In 258 Sun Liang sought to rid himself of his overseers but failed and was dethroned. He was replaced by Sun Xiu, sixth son of Sun Quan, then 22 years old. Sun Xiu staged a coup against Sun Lin and seized power for himself. Sun Xiu died in 264 and was succeeded by Sun Hao. However, by this time he could do little to stop the might of the Jin dynasty, which had just recently conquered Shu Han. Eastern Wu would itself be conquered in 280.

Major warlords

Dong Zhuo, Li Jue, and Guo Si
Dong Zhuo and his brother Dong Min were born to Dong Junya (hailing from Lintao, Longxi Commandery) in Yingchuan Commandery. As a youth, Dong Zhuo was reputed to possess immense strength and to carry two bows at each side. In 165 he became a major under Zhang Huan. For his service in defeating Qiang rebels, Dong Zhuo was promoted through the imperial ranks until he became Administrator of Hedong Commandery in the early 180s. In the summer of 184, Dong Zhuo was dispatched to take over overall operations against the Yellow Turban Rebellion, however he was unsuccessful in this endeavor, and dismissed in the autumn. Dong Zhuo was then dispatched as a subordinate general under Zhang Wen against the Liang Province rebellion. In late 185, Dong Zhuo and Bao Hong defeated the Liang rebels at Meiyang in Youfufeng Commandery. However, when they gave chase to the rebel forces, they were surrounded and forced to fight their way out. Dong Zhuo disguised his army as fishermen to escape the enemy forces. When they passed by, Dong Zhuo had his men destroy the river dam, blocking the enemy's path, and securing their retreat. Dong Zhuo refused to obey a summons from Zhang Wen, whose staff officer Sun Jian recommended he execute Dong Zhuo. Dong Zhuo later served in the imperial army against another group of rebel forces laying siege to Chencang in Youfufeng Commandery. The commanding general Huangfu Song defeated the rebels without heeding any of the advice Dong Zhuo gave him. It was said that Dong Zhuo was arrogant and insubordinate.

In 189, Emperor Ling of Han died. General-in-Chief He Jin called on Dong Zhuo to support his elimination of the eunuchs from power. However, by the time he reached Luoyang, He Jin had already been killed by the eunuchs, who were in turn killed by the guards. On 25 September, 189, Dong Zhuo took possession of the emperor Liu Bian and his brother Liu Xie, establishing his puppet regime in Luoyang. On 28 September he forced Liu Bian to abdicate in favor of his brother Liu Xie. Then he killed Liu Bian a few days later. In the spring of 190 the governors in the east formed a coalition and led a Campaign against Dong Zhuo. Pressured by the enemy alliance, Dong Zhuo moved the court west to Chang'an in the summer after plundering Luoyang. In the spring of 191 Luoyang was captured by Yuan Shu's general Sun Jian. On 22 May, 192, Dong Zhuo was killed by Wang Yun and Lü Bu, who were soon overthrown by Dong Zhuo's former officers, Li Jue, Guo Si and Fan Chou.

In 194 there was a brief war with Ma Teng and Han Sui who were defeated by Guo Si and Fan Chou. In 195 Li Jue killed Fan Chou and took over his troops. Guo Si turned on Li Jue and infighting between them went on for months until a ceasefire was called. In the confusion of the conflict, the emperor was able to escape Chang'an and fled east with the help of several supporters. The emperor reached Luoyang in 196 and was then taken to Yingchuan Commandery by Cao Cao. In 197 Guo Si was killed by his officer Wu Xi. In 198 a local warlord Duan Wei killed Li Jue.

Gongsun Du, Kang, Gong, and Yuan
Gongsun Du was born in Xiangping (Liaoyang, Liaoning). In his early years, Du's father fled to Xuantu Commandery, where Du became an office runner. Du attracted the support of the governor Gongsun Yu, whose daughter he eventually married. He rose up the ranks of officialdom in Ji Province until he became regional inspector.

Gongsun Du was appointed Administrator of Liaodong Commandery by Dong Zhuo in 189 on the recommendation of Xu Rong. As a result of his lowly origins, Du harbored an intense hatred for the elite landowning class. Once he became administrator, Du carried out his vendetta against the wealthy by publicly flogging to death the Magistrate of Xiangping and extirpating the gentry. Du dominated the northeast and expanded into the territory of Goguryeo and the Wuhuan. When Cao Cao attempted to bestow titles upon Du, he rejected them and proclaimed himself king. Du died in 204 and was succeeded by his son, Gongsun Kang. In 204 Kang expanded into Goguryeo and created Daifang Commandery. When the Wuhuan were defeated by Cao Cao in 207, Yuan Shang, Yuan Xi, and the Wuhuan leaders Louban and Supuyan fled to Kang. Kang killed them and sent their heads to Cao Cao. In 208, Kang sent aid to Balgi in support of his claim to the Goguryeo throne, but was defeated by Gyesu, younger brother of Sansang of Goguryeo. However in 209 Kang invaded Goguryeo again, took its capital and forced them to submit. Goguryeo was forced to move its capital further east. Kang died in 220 when his children were too young to rule, so his brother Gongsun Gong succeeded him. Gong maintained his independence, albeit while accepting titles issued by Cao Pi. Gong became ill and was replaced by his nephew Gongsun Yuan in 228. Yuan ruled independently until Sima Yi invaded in 238 and annexed his territory.

Gongsun Zan
Gongsun Zan was born to a family of high officials and received education from Lu Zhi and Liu Kuan, in the process becoming friends with Liu Bei. He took office as a local officer in Liaoxi Commandery, where the administrator was so impressed with his appearance and booming voice that he gave his daughter to him in marriage. Later on, Zan became assistant magistrate of a county in Liaodong Commandery and made a name for himself fighting the Wuhuan and Xianbei. He was particularly known for leading a unit of mounted archers who only rode white horses. It was said that he was so well known among the Xianbei that they used his image for target practice. Despite Zan's success in halting Xianbei raids on Han territory, he was dismissed for losing a large portion of his men in an attack against numerically superior forces. Zan was eventually reappointed and given command of Wuhuan auxiliaries in 187 to deal with the Liang Province rebellion. For his service he was promoted to Commandant of Cavalry and went on to defeat the rebels Zhang Ju, Zhang Chun, and the Wuhuan chieftain Qiuliju in 188. However Qiuliju escaped and surrendered to the governor of You Province, Liu Yu. Liu Yu was rewarded with rank and enfeoffment, making Zan resentful of him.

When Dong Zhuo took power, he made Gongsun Zan a general in charge of Ji county in Guangyang Commandery under Liu Yu, who became Grand Marshal. In 191 Zan defeated a group of Yellow Turbans moving north from the Shandong Peninsula. His cousin Gongsun Yue died at the hands of Yuan Shao while on a mission to Yuan Shu, making the two enemies. He then seized a part of Ji Province but was badly defeated the next year. Recouping his losses, Zan defeated an invasion by Cui Juye and sent Tian Kai to invade Qing Province, which was also defeated. In 193 a truce was arranged, but Yuan Shao's ally Liu Yu attacked Zan anyway, and was defeated and killed. In 195 insurgents led by Xianyu Fu and Yan Rou removed Zan from power with the assistance of Yuan Shao's troops. Zan retreated to Yi city where he secluded himself with his harem. He managed to repulse one attack by Qu Yi before Yuan Shao brought his main army in 198 and laid siege to the city. Zan sent his son Xu to seek aid from Zhang Yan, leader of the Heishan bandits. However by the time reinforcements arrived, Yuan Shao's sappers had already breached Zan's fortifications and Zan killed himself and his family rather than surrender. Gongsun Xu was later killed by the Tuge tribe of the Xiongnu.

Kong Rong
Kong Rong was a descendant of Confucius born in 153 to a minor government official, Kong Zhou, in Lu Commandery. As the sixth child Kong Rong showed great wit and harbored aspirations beyond his age. In 169, the reformist Zhang Jian fled the court in fear of the eunuchs and sought refuge at the Kong estate. Kong Rong hid him from the authorities until he left, but they came back later and arrested Kong Rong as well as his brother Kong Bao. Kong Bao claimed responsibility, arguing that Zhang Jian initially sought his aid while his brother only acted as the agent. He was executed.

In the late 170s, Kong Rong joined the offices of Yang Ci, from which position he fought the influence of the palace eunuchs. In 184, Kong Rong sought an audience with He Jin, who gave him employment in the Imperial Censorate. Kong Rong resigned from his position on grounds of disagreements with the head of the Censorate, Zhao She. Later he became General of the Household in charge of the palace guards.

When Dong Zhuo took power in 189, Kong Rong opposed the deposition of Liu Bian. As a result, Kong Rong was demoted and sent to deal with Beihai Commandery, which was experiencing serious troubles with banditry. As Chancellor of Beihai Commandery, Kong Rong sought to restore order by settling the people and building schools. However he was criticized as pretentious and ineffectual, having done little to deal with the Yellow Turbans and local bandits. In 193 he was attacked by the bandit leader Guan Hai. Kong Rong sent his subordinate Taishi Ci to seek aid from Liu Bei. Liu Bei sent a relief force and scattered the bandit army. In 196 Yuan Shao's son Yuan Tan attacked Beihai Commandery, but Kong Rong had made no preparations, and instead spent his time in literary pursuits. When Yuan Tan captured Beihai Commandery, Kong Rong fled to Cao Cao, who made him Court Architect. Kong Rong constantly demeaned Cao Cao's achievements and made fun of him but was tolerated due to his popularity at court. In 208 Kong Rong finally went too far and was killed for ridiculing Cao Cao in a self-righteous manner. His son and daughter were also executed.

Liu Biao
Liu Biao, a distant descendant of Emperor Jing of Han, was born in 142 in Shanyang Commandery. As a child, he studied under the Administrator of Nanyang Commandery, Wang Chang. In the 160s, Liu Biao joined the reformist faction at the Taixue of Luoyang. As a result, he was ousted from office in 169. When the Great Proscription came to an end in 184, Liu Biao was reinstated as a clerk in the offices of General-in-Chief He Jin.

In 190, Sun Jian killed Wang Rui, the Inspector of Jing Province. Liu Biao was appointed the new Inspector of Jing Province, but Yuan Shu was already in control of Nanyang Commandery, so he went further south and set up base in Xiangyang. He was attacked by Sun Jian in 191, but Sun Jian died almost immediately after in a skirmish. In the late 190s a rebellion by Zhang Xiu disrupted Liu Biao's territory until Zhang Xiu died in 200. He gave refuge to Liu Bei, who urged him to attack Cao Cao in 207, but Liu Biao declined. In 208 Liu Biao was invaded by Cao Cao in the north and Sun Quan in the south. Liu Biao died that autumn and his son Liu Zong surrendered to Cao Cao.

Liu Yan and Liu Zhang
Liu Yan was a descendant of Liu Yu, the fifth son of Emperor Jing of Han. Seeking to distance himself from the turmoil at the capital, Liu Yan sought and received appointment as Governor of Yi Province in 188. He set his headquarters at Mianzhu in Guanghan Commandery. Soon after he raised troops in the name of Dong Zhuo and appointed the sect leaders Zhang Lu and Zhang Xiu as officers. They were sent to attack Su Gu, the Administrator of Hanzhong Commandery, who defied Liu Yan. After Su Gu was defeated, Zhang Lu took Hanzhong Commandery for himself and eliminated Zhang Xiu. Liu Yan recruited troops from migrants and refugees from Central China, creating a unit known as the Dongzhou Troops (東州兵 dongzhoubing). The Administrator of Jianwei Commandery, Ren Qi and loyalist Jia Long attacked Liu Yan in 191, but they were defeated and killed. After moving his capital to Luo city, also in Guanghan, Liu Yan formed an alliance with Ma Teng in 194 and attacked Li Jue's regime in Chang'an. The campaign ended in failure and Liu Yan's sons Fan and Dan died in the attempt. Liu Yan died the same year after having moved his capital to Chengdu in Shu Commandery, where his son Liu Zhang succeeded him.

Liu Zhang put down an insurrection caused by Hu Mao, an agent of the Chang'an regime. In 200 Zhang Lu openly defied Liu Zhang, who in retaliation killed Zhang Lu's mother, who had been staying at his court as hostage. Zhang Lu invaded Liu Zhang's territory, occupying northern Ba Commandery. A follower of Liu Zhang also rebelled at this time due to grievances with the Dongzhou Troops, but he was defeated and killed. After Cao Cao's defeat at the Battle of Red Cliffs in 208, Liu Zhang formed an alliance with Liu Bei. When Cao Cao's general Zhong Yao was sent against Zhang Lu in 211, Liu Zhang invited Liu Bei to Guanghan hoping that someone from the same imperial clan would help him. Liu Bei spent the next year complaining about the lack of supplies, then turned on Liu Zhang, killed his officers, and waged war on him. By 214 Liu Bei's forces had advanced to Chengdu, where a siege lasting several weeks occurred before Liu Zhang surrendered. Liu Zhang was exiled to Jing Province where he eventually entered the court of Sun Quan when his general Lü Meng defeated Guan Yu in 219.

Lü Bu

Lü Bu killed his patron Ding Yuan at the request of Dong Zhuo and became his bodyguard. In 190 Lü Bu was sent to plunder the tombs of Luoyang. His behavior was unruly and disruptive to his unit, causing his commander Hu Zhen to suffer defeat at the hands of Sun Jian. Lü Bu was also defeated and driven from Luoyang. Conflict between Dong Zhuo and Lü Bu soon came to a head and in 192 Lü Bu conspired with Wang Yun to kill Dong Zhuo. After ambushing and killing Dong Zhuo, Wang Yun's government was toppled by Li Jue in less than a month and Lü Bu was forced to flee to Yuan Shu but was turned away because of the unruly behavior of his men. Next Lü Bu visited Zhang Yang and then left when Li Jue offered a price for his head. In 193 he participated in Yuan Shao's campaign against the Black Mountain bandits. Once again the brutality of his men caused consternation and Yuan Shao sent Lü Bu back to Luoyang and ordered his escort to kill Lü Bu. Lü Bu managed to avoid assassination and fled. In 194 Lü Bu joined Zhang Chao and Zhang Miao's rebellion against Cao Cao in Yan Province. While initially successful, the rebel forces failed to take Puyang in Dong Commandery, and the tide turned against them. By the summer of 195 Lü Bu was forced to flee again, this time to Liu Bei in Xu Province. In 196 Yuan Shu attacked Liu Bei. Lü Bu switched sides, capturing Liu Bei's assets in Xiapi Commandery, and taking his surrender. After defeating Liu Bei, Lü Bu turned on Yuan Shu and drove back his army. The defeated Liu Bei later fled to Cao Cao, who in 198 sent Xiahou Dun to assist Liu Bei against Lü Bu. Lü Bu was unable to coordinate his commanders, who acted separately, and was driven back to Xiapi Commandery where his officers eventually betrayed him, opening the gates for the opposing army. When Lü Bu tried to persuade Cao Cao to accept him as a subordinate, Liu Bei argued against it. Lü Bu was strangled to death.

Shi Xie
Shi Xie was born to Shi Ci in Cangwu Commandery in the year 137. He attended the Taixue in Luoyang before returning home upon his father's death and took up the post of Administrator of Jiaozhi Commandery in the 180s.

After the Administrator Zhu Fu was killed in 190, Shi Xie and his brothers Yi, Wei, and Wu took full control of Jiaozhou. He ruled from his capital Long Biên (Luy Lâu) in modern Hanoi and brought prosperity to the region, taking in many refugees from the north. His brothers Yi, Wei, and Wu administered the commanderies of Hepu, Jiuzhen, and Nanhai respectively.

In 192, the southernmost district of Rinan Commandery, Xianglin, broke away and became the Kingdom of Lâm Ấp, otherwise known as Champa. Aside from this incident, Shi Xie's realm was relatively secluded from the state of endemic warfare and turmoil to the north. He provided support to the general Zhang Jin, situated in Cangwu and Yulin commanderies, in his conflicts with Liu Biao from 196 to 205, but stopped after the general's death. Shi Xie played no further role in the military affairs of the warlord states.

When Shi Wu died in 200, the Shi family lost control of the Pearl River region, but Shi Xie contented himself with ruling the reduced portion of Jiaozhi. Shi Xie was well disposed towards the northern warlords and acquiesced to Sun Quan's chosen Inspector of Jiaozhi, Bu Zhi, who visited Nanhai Commandery in 211. Shi Xie then sent his son Xin to Sun Quan as hostage in 217. Reduced to only Jiaozhi Commandery, Shi Xie died in 226 at the age of 90. His son Shi Hui was given the post of prefect in Jiuzhen Commandery while Chen Shi became prefect of Jiaozhi Commandery. At this point Sun Quan's agent, Lü Dai, decided to split Jiaozhou in half with the northern portion (Guangzhou) assigned to himself and the southern half, the new Jiaozhou, to Dai Liang. Shi Hui refused to let Dai Liang into the province and decided to rebel. His officials opposed him in rebelling against Sun Quan and laid siege to him in his capital, however they were unable to breach the city gates and were eventually forced to make peace. Lü Dai contacted Shi Hui's cousin and sent him with an offer of clemency on the condition that Shi Hui surrender peacefully. Shi Hui accepted the offer and together with his brothers and sons surrendered. Lü Dai reneged on his promise and beheaded them all, after which he abolished the two provinces, once again merging them together into Jiaozhou.

After Shi Xie's death, the southern frontier continued to be viewed as an area of barbarians in the Han imagination. When Xue Zong visited the south in 231, he described the place in the following manner:

Shi Xie is primarily remembered today in Vietnam as Sĩ Nhiếp, the father of education and Buddhism, which he patronized greatly during his reign. He was credited with compiling a dictionary of Classical Chinese terms explained in vernacular Vietnamese language several centuries later. According to Stephen O'Harrow, Shi Xie was "the first Vietnamese."

Yuan Shao, Shang, Xi, and Tan

Yuan Shao was born to a highly distinguished official family who had held office as one of the Three Ducal Ministers, the three highest posts below emperor, for three generations. The exact circumstances of Yuan Shao's  birth and lineage are not clear but it's said that he was the son of Yuan Feng by a concubine, who then chose to adopt the lineage of his uncle Yuan Cheng (who lacked an heir). This was a source of contention between Shao and his half brother Yuan Shu, who was the son of Feng and his chief wife, making him senior to Shao within the Feng family. However, because Shao was adopted into the family of Feng's elder brother Cheng, he became the senior cousin, and higher up in the Yuan hierarchy than Shu. Envious of Shao's greater prestige and popularity, Shu referred to him as "our family slave" and claimed that Shao was not a true member of the Yuan clan.

Yuan Shao grew to be a handsome young man and a popular leader among his peers in Luoyang. At some point, he and Cao Cao raided a wedding, but after Cao Cao kidnapped the bride, he directed the pursuers to Shao. In the late 160s, Shao, then in his 20s, aided the reformist faction in escaping persecution by the eunuchs. After that he received appointment as a county magistrate in Dong Commandery. He then left office for six years to mourn the death of his adoptive mother and father. Upon returning to Luoyang, Shao entered the service of the Imperial Censorate, and rose through the ranks until he became a colonel in the imperial corps of the Western Garden by 188.

Following the death of Emperor Ling of Han in 189, Yuan Shao urged He Jin to destroy the eunuchs. When He Jin was killed, Shao led a massacre of the eunuchs. After Dong Zhuo came to power, Shao fled east and formed a coalition army to embark on a Campaign against Dong Zhuo. Based in Suanzao in Chenliu Commandery, the coalition army met with little success throughout 190, so in 191 Shao took over Ji Province from Han Fu. When the coalition dissolved, Shao sent men against Yuan Shu's officer Sun Jian in Yingchuan Commandery. Gongsun Zan attacked Shao but was defeated at Jie Bridge between Julu and Qinghe commanderies. Shao set his capital at the city of Ye (Hebei) in Wei Commandery. In 193 Shao attacked the Black Mountain bandits and forced them into hiding. In 195, Zang Hong rebelled against Shao but was defeated and sentenced to death. Shao's follower Chen Rong criticized him of dishonorable conduct and was executed as well. With the support of the Wuhuan, he made the final attack on Gongsun Zan in 198 and eliminated him the beginning of next year. In 199 Shao became hostile to Cao Cao and moved against him. His army moved too slow however and in early winter of 200, Cao Cao destroyed two of his supply trains at the Battle of Guandu. His army scattered and fled. Shao became ill and died in 202. He was succeeded by his son Yuan Shang.

Cao Cao attacked in the autumn. By the summer of 203 Yuan Shang had been defeated and driven back to Ye, however Cao Cao decided to withdraw at this point. Shang came into open conflict with his brother Yuan Tan, who fled east. In 204 Shang besieged his brother at Pingyuan Commandery but Cao Cao moved against him at Ye and forced him to flee to Zhongshan Commandery where Tan attacked him. Shang fled again to his other brother Yuan Xi in You Province while Cao Cao attacked Tan at Nanpi in Bohai Commandery and killed him. In 205 Shang and Xi were ejected from their territory by mutineers and fled to the Wuhuan under Tadun, but Tadun was defeated by Cao Cao at the Battle of White Wolf Mountain in 207. They fled for the last time, this time to Gongsun Kang, who killed them and sent their heads to Cao Cao.

Yuan Shu
Yuan Shu was born to a highly distinguished official family who had held office as one of the Three Ducal Ministers, the three highest posts below emperor, for three generations. Despite acquiring a respectful reputation for himself and later becoming General of the Household Rapid as Tigers, Yuan Shu was ultimately overshadowed by his more popular and successful half-brother Yuan Shao.

Yuan Shu and Yuan Shao urged He Jin to kill the eunuchs at Luoyang. When Dong Zhuo took over, Yuan Shu fled to Nanyang Commandery. His army took part in the Campaign against Dong Zhuo under Sun Jian's command, but when Sun Jian returned from Luoyang, Yuan Shao became hostile and sent Zhou Ang against him. Yuan Shu allied with Gongsun Zan while his half brother allied with Liu Biao. Sun Jian soon died in a skirmish while on campaign against Liu Biao so Yuan Shu withdrew east to Chenliu Commandery where he was driven away as well by Cao Cao in 193. He then retreated to Shouchun in Jiujiang Commandery. The next year Yuan Shu sent Wu Jing against Governor of Yang Province, Liu Yao, with the extra help of Sun Ce in 195. In 196 Yuan Shu defeated Liu Bei in Xu Province with the aid of Lü Bu, who then changed sides and forced Yuan Shu's forces back to Shouchun. In 197 Yuan Shu declared himself emperor of the Zhong dynasty, which made everybody hate him. Sun Ce abandoned him while Cao Cao seized territory north of the Huai River. His fledgling dynasty was left in ruin and in 199 Yuan Shu attempted to escape to Qing Province, but was driven back to Shouchun, where he died outside the city. His family fled to Liu Xun, Administrator of Lujiang Commandery. Liu Xun later fled to Cao Cao when Sun Ce captured his capital. He was executed for extortion and corruption at a later date.

Zhang Lu
Zhang Lu was the head of a Daoist movement known as the Way of the Five Pecks of Rice. in 190 Liu Yan, Governor of Yi Province, sent Zhang Lu and Zhang Xiu (not related) against the rebellious Administrator of Hanzhong Commandery, Su Gu. Zhang Lu and Zhang Xiu killed Su Gu and took the territory for themselves. Zhang Lu killed Zhang Xiu and established a theocracy with religious Libationers as the primary civil authority. He preached confession of sins and the use of charms to cure illness. Minor wrongdoers were forced to become public servants who provided refreshments for travelers on the road. Alcohol was banned. In 200 Zhang Lu moved against Liu Zhang and seized northern Ba Commandery. His mother, who had been kept as a captive by Liu Zhang, was killed. In 214 Zhang Lu provided Ma Chao with some troops but when Ma Chao asked for more, he refused, after which Ma Chao turned to Liu Bei. In 215 Cao Cao attacked Zhang Lu. After his brother Zhang Wei was defeated, Zhang Lu fled to the Zong and Banshun natives for protection but they surrendered to Cao Cao and Zhang Lu was forced to submit as well. Cao Cao treated him well and his family was given honored positions at court. Zhang Lu died in Ye city in 216.

Zhang Yang
Born in Yunzhong Commandery, Zhang Yang was noted for his courage and fighting skills. He served as Assistant Officer for Military Affairs in Bing Province before joining the Western Garden corps as an acting major in 188.

In 189, General-in-Chief He Jin sent Zhang Yang to attack the hill bandits in Shangdang Commandery, however He Jin died later that year and Dong Zhuo seized power at the capital. Zhang Yang tried to seize Shangdang Commandery for himself. While he failed to oust the commandery's Administrator, he  managed to gather several thousand followers while plundering the local counties. When the coalition against Dong Zhuo formed, he attempted to join it, but his partner the wandering Xiongnu mercenary Yufuluo forced him to attack Yuan Shao instead. They were defeated at the city of Ye. After that Zhang Yang received commission from Dong Zhuo as Administrator of Henei Commandery, so he based himself at Yewang across the Yellow River from Luoyang. In 192 and 193 he gave refuge to Lü Bu. When Cao Cao attacked Lü Bu at Xiapi in 198, Zhang Yang attempted to strike Cao Cao from the rear, but was killed by his own officer Yang Chou, who held a grudge against Lü Bu. After he defected to Cao Cao, Yang Chou was in turn killed by another officer Sui Gu who then attempted to seek help from Yuan Shao. He was defeated the following year by Cao Cao's officers Shi Huan and Cao Ren

Minor warlords

Gao Gan
Born to Gao Gong in Chenliu Commandery, Gao Gan was a nephew of Yuan Shao. He played an instrumental role in convincing Han Fu to hand over Ji Province to Yuan Shao in 191. As reward, Yuan Shao made Gao Gan Governor of Bing Province. In 202, Gao Gan joined the Southern Xiongnu chanyu Huchuquan in attacking Hedong Commandery. They were defeated and Huchuquan surrendered to Cao Cao's officer Zhong Yao. Gao Gan surrendered to Cao Cao in 204 but felt unsatisfied with his new position as Inspector of Bing Province. In 205, Gao Gao seized Shangdang Commandery and invaded Hedong Commandery. Gao Gan failed to take Ye and was driven back. In 206, Cao Cao personally led an attack on Gao Gao, forcing him to flee to the Xiongnu and then to the south in Jing Province, where he was captured and killed.

Han Fu
Han Fu was appointed Governor of Ji Province in 189. While he nominally participated in the Campaign against Dong Zhuo, he stayed at the city of Ye. After the coalition broke up, he became hostile to Yuan Shao in 191 and denied him supplies. Using his family connections, Yuan Shao intimidated Han Fu into handing over his position to him. After doing so, Han Fu's family was constantly harassed until they fled to Zhang Miao. He eventually killed himself.

Liu Chong

Liu Chong, otherwise known as Prince Min of Chen, was the son of Liu Cheng. In 173, Liu Chong and former Chancellor Wei Yin offered sacrifices to Huang–Lao for good fortune, but the practice was seen as reprehensible by the senior officials. The official Shi Qian accused Wei Yin and Liu Chong of impiety. An official inquiry was carried out which resulted in the arrest of both Shi Qian and Wei Yin. They were both executed and no further investigation of Liu Chong occurred. Liu Chong was said to be a fine shot with the crossbow and had written a treatise on the weapon called the Nushe bifa. When the Yellow Turban Rebellion broke out in 184, he raised several thousand archers and brought them to the capital where his presence quelled any unrest. In 190, he formed an alliance with Dong Zhuo and styled himself General Who Supports Han while his Chancellor Luo Jun maintained his territory in Chen Commandery. When Yuan Shu's request for supplies was denied by Luo Jun in 197, he sent assassins who killed both Luo Jun and Liu Chong.

Liu Yao
Liu Yao, son of Liu Yu and nephew of Liu Chong, was born in 157 in Donglai Commandery. At the age of 18 he saved his uncle Liu Wei from a kidnapping. He became a county magistrate in Liang but resigned because he disapproved of the favor shown by the Chancellor to eunuchs. Liu Yao then served as an Assistant Officer in Qing Province and in the clerical bureau at the capital, but refused an invitation to join the Censorate.

In the 190s Liu Yao established himself in Danyang Commandery while his officer Zhu Hao held Yuzhang Commandery. In 195 Sun Ce defeated Liu Yao's forces and forced him to flee to Yuzhang Commandery, where Ze Rong had previously seized power. He eliminated Ze Rong but otherwise played no role in external affairs until 198 when he died. His family entered the court of Sun Ce and were treated well.

Liu Yu
Liu Yu, son of Liu Shu, held local office his county and became a magistrate in Donghai Commandery. It was said that his virtue protected the county from a plague of locusts. He was promoted to Inspector of You Province, where he wore the local clothing of fur and felt. His government was praised by the people and he received regular tribute from the non-Chinese. In 184, he was sent as Chancellor to Ganling, where his record of humane rule settled the hotbed of Yellow Turban discontent. In 188, he was sent back to You Province. As Governor, he persuaded the Wuhuan chieftain Qiuliju to surrender and murdered the rebel Zhang Chun. Yuan Shao suggested that he be made regent instead of Dong Zhuo or even take the throne for himself, but Liu Yu declined. Under Liu Yu's governorship, You Province prospered as a result of policies encouraging silk production, market trading, and production of salt and iron. The province's prosperity and low grain prices attracted many southern refugees. In 191 Liu Yu allied with Yuan Shao, and Gongsun Zan with Yuan Shu. In 193 Liu Yu attempted to oust Gongsun Zan, who had built a fortified camp within the walls of his capital in Guangyang Commandery, but failed. Gongsun Zan counterattacked, driving him from the city. Liu Yu was captured a few days later and executed.

Lu Kang
Lu Kang was born in 125 to an influential local family of Kuaiji Commandery. He served as an officer under the Administrator Li Su, who was later executed for his cowardice. Lu Kang escorted the Administrator's body home to carry out a full mourning, for which he gained a reputation for loyalty. He went on to become a magistrate in Bohai Commandery and ended the military levy there and governed the territory through honest and generous government. In 185, Lu Kang protested the extravagance and corruption involved in the rebuilding of palaces in Luoyang and as a result was dismissed for a time before he became a consultant at the capital. In 188, he became Administrator of Lujiang Commandery in 188. He put down the rebel chieftain Huang Rang and continued to send reports and tribute to the capital even as the Han dynasty fell apart. In 193, Yuan Shu asked Lu Kang for supplies and was refused. Yuan sent Sun Ce against Lu Kang, who surrendered after a two-year siege, in 195. Lu Kang died a month later.

Huang Ang
Huang Ang was the clan leader of Jiuquan Commandery until his family was massacred by the Administrator Xu Yi in 210. He subsequently attacked Xu Yi and killed him. Huang Ang was himself killed in 210 by the vigilante Yang Feng. His relative Huang Hua succeeded him and joined forces with Zhang Jin to oppose Cao Wei in 220. When Zhang Jin was killed Huang Hua surrendered.

Ma Ai
Ma Ai was the Administrator of Dunhuang Commandery until he died in 220. Zhang Gong succeeded him and willingly assisted Cao Wei in re-establishing control over the northwest.

Sheng Xian
Sheng Xian was a close friend of Kong Rong and Administrator of Wu Commandery. He left office in 193 took refuge with his former officer Gao Dai. It's not clear under what circumstances he left. One account suggests he became ill, another that Xu Gong took over by force. Sheng Xian was eventually killed by Sun Quan, who viewed him as a threat to his own authority.

Tao Qian
Tao Qian became Inspector of Xu Province in after 185. He dealt with the Yellow Turbans and restored order to the region, making the province prosperous and a refuge for displaced peoples. In 191 Tao Qian sent 3,000 men to support Zhu Jun against Dong Zhuo. In 193 he entered a loose alliance with Yuan Shu and Gongsun Zan, but that winter Tao Qian's soldiers killed Cao Song, Cao Cao's father. In retaliation Cao Cao brought the full force of his army down on him, ravaging Pengcheng and Xiapi commanderies. Tao Qian fled to Donghai Commandery in 194 and received the aid of Tian Kai and Liu Bei, but died from illness soon afterwards.

Wang Lang
Wang Lang was a scholar who studied the Book of Changes and compiled a commentary on it called the Yi Zhuan. He served as a gentleman cadet and county magistrate in Pengcheng Commandery. He left office when his patron Yang Ci died and refused invitations from the capital. In 191, Wang Lang became Headquarters Officer to Tao Qian. Tao Qian made Wang Lang the Administrator of Kuaiji Commandery, where Wang Lang established a luxurious court, which recorded one of the earliest local histories of China. In 196, Sun Ce invaded Wang Lang's territory and forced him to surrender, but Wang Lang refused to serve him. Two years later Wang Lang was allowed to leave for Cao Cao's court, where he would eventually rise to the position of Excellency under the rule of Cao Pi in 220. During his career he campaigned against the use of mutilation as a punishment and argued for the importance of education as a means to reduce the need for severe punishments. Wang Lang died in 228, leaving a collection of memorials and commentaries on the classics.

Xu Gong
Xu Gong took over Wu Commandery in 193. In 196 he was defeated by Sun Ce and forced to take refuge with Yan Baihu. In 200 Xu Gong allied himself to Cao Cao but was defeated in battle and executed. His retainers ambushed Sun Ce and killed him later that year.

Xu Zhao
Xu Zhao was a leader in southern Wu Commandery. He gave refuge to both Sheng Xian and Yan Baihu as they were driven from their territory in the north. Although Cheng Pu advised Sun Ce to attack Xu Zhao, Sun Ce refused out of respect for his willingness to help others in need. Xu Zhao was later destroyed by Sun Quan in 200.

Zhang Chao
Zhang Chao was the Administrator of Guangling Commandery in 190. He joined the coalition in the Campaign against Dong Zhuo. In 194 Zhang Chao joined his brother Zhang Miao in alliance with Lü Bu against Cao Cao in Yan Province. They were defeated and Zhang Chao was besieged in Yongqiu, Chenliu Commandery in 195. He killed himself and his family.

Zhang Jin
Zhang Jin was the Administrator of Zhangye Commandery. He joined Huang Hua in opposing Cao Cao in 220 but was killed by Su Ze.

Zhang Meng
Zhang Meng was the Administrator of Wuwei Commandery. In 206 Zhang Meng killed the Inspector Handan Shang and promised to pay retribution to anyone who attended to his corpse. An Assistant Officer loyal to Handan Shang carried out the mourning rites and went to Zhang Meng's residence to seek revenge for his superior. Recognizing his great sense of loyalty, Zhang Meng decided not to put him to death, and let Pang Yu leave for Jiuquan Commandery. In 210 Zhang Meng was defeated by Han Sui.

Zhu Jun
Zhu Jun's father died when he was very young. His mother raised him working as a silk seller. After working as a clerk in his local county office, Zhu Jun joined the commandery staff, where he spent almost 20 years before becoming Registrar to the Administrator Yin Duan. In 173, Yin Duan was reported by provincial authorities for failing to defeat the rebel Xu Chang, but Zhu Jun intercepted the letter, resulting in a reduced sentence for Yin Duan. Zhu Jun went on to become a magistrate in Donghai Commandery before he was sent to Jiaozhi in 181 as Inspector to deal with a rebellion by Liang Long. He raised 5,000 troops from his home in Kuaiji Commandery and defeated the rebellion within a matter of weeks. Zhu Jun was recalled to the capital and promoted to Counsellor Remonstrant. In 184, Zhu Jun and Huangfu Song were sent to deal with the Yellow Turban Rebellion in the south. They experienced some setbacks but managed to pacify Yingchuan, Runan, and Chen commanderies by autumn. Zhu Jun then moved to Nanyang Commandery and defeated the rebels there through deception. In 185, he was promoted again but left office when his mother died. He returned to the capital at some point and took up a number of posts.

When Dong Zhuo seized power in 189, he wanted to make Zhu Jun his chief assistant, but Zhu Jun refused in protest of moving the capital to Chang'an. Dong Zhuo left Zhu Jun in charge of Luoyang after he headed west for Chang'an. Zhu Jun defected to the coalition forces and moved south in 191 to Jing Province. In the following year, he was defeated by Dong Zhuo's commanders Guo Si and Li Jue. He returned to the imperial court after Dong Zhuo's assassination and served until 195 when he was taken captive by Guo Si, who had by then broken out in open conflict with Li Jue. Zhu Jun fell ill and died soon after. He was noted for being filial and generous to his peers.

Former rebels

Han Sui
Han Sui was born to an influential family in Jincheng Commandery. His father held appointment at the capital and in 178, Han Sui followed in his father's footsteps by becoming a Reporting Officer at Luoyang. During his stay at the capital, he became friends with Cao Cao, and was instrumental in urging General-in-Chief He Jin to eliminate the eunuchs. However He Jin was reluctant and after some time Han Sui returned to his homeland in the west, where he became Assistant Officer of Liang Province.

In 184, Han Sui and his colleague Bian Zhang joined Beigong Boyu in the Liang Province rebellion. Together they attacked Chang'an in 185 and 188/189. After their first failure to take Chang'an, Han Sui killed Beigong Boyu and seized command himself with Wang Guo as a figurehead. They failed to take Chang'an again in 189. Wang Guo was deposed and the rebel forces split up into three groups: Han Sui in Jincheng Commandery, Ma Teng in Longxi Commandery, and Song Jian on the upper Yellow River. He initially supported Dong Zhuo and his successor Li Jue, but turned on them in 194 when he joined Ma Teng in attacking Chang'an. They were defeated at Changping Slope northwest of Chang'an and Han Sui was forced to withdraw to Youfufeng Commandery. Han Sui fell out with Ma Teng, possibly due to the machinations of Cao Cao's agent Zhong Yao, and they began to skirmish with Ma Teng taking the heavier losses, causing him to join Cao Cao. In 210 Han Sui defeated Zhang Meng in Wuwei Commandery. In 211 Cao Cao sent troops against Zhang Lu. Believing that this was a preliminary attack on themselves, Han Sui and Ma Chao forged an alliance and confronted the enemy troops with initial success, driving them away. Later, Cao Cao personally led an army against the western alliance. When the three armies met at Huayin, Han Sui attempted to negotiate with Cao Cao and talked of the old days when they were friends at Luoyang, but Cao Cao's replies were mixed. The two sides agreed on a day to do battle. Han Sui and Ma Chao were defeated and forced to retreat. In 214 Xiahou Yuan drove Han Sui from Hanyang Commandery. Han Sui's officer Yan Xing rebelled against him and defected to Cao Cao. Han Sui died in 215 at the age of 70.

Ma Teng and Ma Chao
Ma Teng's family claimed descent from the famed general Ma Yuan, but his father was quite poor while his mother was of Qiang origin. Ma Teng grew to be quite tall at eight chi in height (185 cm). He made a living cutting firewood before joining the militia against the Liang Province rebellion.

Ma Teng rose to major under Inspector Geng Bi until Geng Bi was killed by mutineers in 187. Ma Teng then joined the mutineers, styling himself a general under the command of Wang Guo. After Wang Guo was defeated in 189, Ma Teng set himself up as an independent ruler in Longxi Commandery. When Dong Zhuo retreated to Chang'an, he persuaded Ma Teng and Han Sui to assist him against the other warlords. Ma Teng continued his allegiance to the Chang'an regime for a time even after Dong Zhuo's death and usurpation by Li Jue. In 194, he betrayed Li Jue and attacked Chang'an with the aid of Han Sui and supporters in Luoyang. Ma Teng and Han Sui were defeated at Changping Slope northwest of Chang'an and he retreated to Liang Province. Around 197 Ma Teng began to quarrel with Han Sui and their forces engaged in battle with Ma Teng losing the exchange. His son Ma Chao was wounded in battle by Yan Xing while his wife and other sons were also lost, forcing him to retreat to Youfufeng Commandery. He threw in his lot with Cao Cao in 202, sending Ma Chao to fight Yuan Shao's officer Guo Yuan in Hedong Commandery, and in 205 he himself campaigned against Sun Quan's officer Zhang Cheng. In 208 Ma Teng was enfeoffed but kept hostage in Ye while his son Ma Chao succeeded him in Liang Province. In 211 Ma Chao and Han Sui became hostile to Cao Cao. Ma Teng was killed the next year.

Ma Chao and Han Sui were defeated by Cao Cao at Huayin and retreated west. In 213 Ma Chao made an alliance with the Qiang and Di people as well as Zhang Lu. He then seized Hanyang Commandery. In the autumn an uprising by Yang Fu and Jiang Xu defeated Ma Chao and forced him to take refuge with Zhang Lu. Zhang Lu provided Ma Chao with troops to make an attempt to re-establish himself in Liang Province, but Ma Chao was defeated by Xiahou Yuan. Realizing that Zhang Lu would not provide him with any more troops, Ma Chao joined Liu Bei, who made him a general. Under Liu Bei, Ma Chao campaigned against Cao Cao in Wudu Commandery in 217 but failed to make any headway. Ma Chao died in 222.

Song Jian
Song Jian led an uprising in Liang Province in 184. After 185 he returned to his home county of Fuhan and declared himself King of the Sources of the River Who Will Pacify Han. In the winter of 214 Cao Cao's general Xiahou Yuan attacked Fuhan and killed Song Jian and his officers.

Bandits

Congqian
Congqian's name means "Follow Money". He was a bandit active in Donglai Commandery until put down by He Kui and Zhang Liao in 200.

Gan Ning
Gan Ning was the leader of an influential vigilante bandit group in Ba Commandery known for their expertise with bows and crossbows. Gan Ning treated local officials who aided him generously but plundered the territories of those who did not. Later he abandoned his life as a youxia and studied philosophy.

When Liu Yan, the Governor of Yi Province, died in 194, his son Liu Zhang refused to hand over the province to the court appointed Inspector, Hu Mao. Gan Ning aided Hu Mao in his conflict with Liu Zhang but they were defeated. Gan Ning fled with 800 followers to Liu Biao and then Huang Zu, who treated him with disdain due to his past history as a bandit. At the Battle of Xiakou in 203, Huang Zu's fleet was defeated in an attack by Sun Quan, and he himself was nearly captured until Gan Ning killed the enemy general, Ling Cao, with an arrow. Despite being saved by Gan Ning, Huang Zu continued to treat his savior coldly and refused to bestow upon him any rewards or promotions. He even tried to induce Gang Ning's men to abandon him.

In 207, Gan Ning was assigned to an eastern border post with the help of a sympathetic officer, Su Fei. From there he crossed over the border and defected to Sun Quan, where he found better terms of service. When Huang Zu was destroyed by Sun Quan in the following year, Gan Ning spoke in favor of Su Fei, saving his life. Gan Ning participated in several following campaigns, notably at the Battle of Yiling where he held off Cao Ren's forces long enough for reinforcements to arrive despite being outnumbered five to one. In 215, he maintained the rearguard when Sun Quan was defeated at the Battle of Xiaoyao Ford, saving his lord's life. In 217, he took a small raiding party into Cao Cao's main camp at the Battle of Ruxu and decimated the enemy forces. Gan Ning died in 220.

Gong Du
Gong Du was a bandit in Runan Commandery. In 200, Gong Du allied with Yuan Shao and with the assistance of Liu Bei killed Cao Cao's officer, Cai Yang. The next year Cao Cao retaliated, forcing Liu Bei to flee, and scattering Gong Du's followers.

White Tiger Yan
Yan Baihu, or "White Tiger Yan", was a bandit leader of possibly Shanyue origins. When Sun Ce came to Wu Commandery in 195, Yan Baihu gave refuge to the displaced Xu Gong and threatened the flank of Sun Ce's army. However Sun Ce paid him no attention and the two avoided any altercations. In 197, Cao Cao's agent Chen Yu provoked Yan into rebellion. Sun Ce sent Lü Fan to drive out Chen Yu while he himself attacked Yan. The defeated Yan fled south to join Xu Zhao but died soon afterwards. Remnants of Yan's band joined Xu Gong in 200 to threaten Sun Ce's rear as he attacked Huang Zu in the west. Sun Ce decided to retreat and finish off the bandits once and for all, only to fall into an ambush and die at their hands.

Yang Feng
Yang Feng was a leader of the Bobo bandit group in Xihe Commandery. He joined Li Jue but rebelled against him in 195. In 196 Yang Feng aided Emperor Xian of Han in escaping the capital. Dong Zhao approached Yang Feng on behalf of Cao Cao and convinced him to let the emperor travel to Xu city. Later Yang Feng tried to interfere in the move and was defeated by Cao Cao in battle, after which he fled to Yuan Shu. In 197 Yang Feng rebelled against Yuan Shu in support of Lü Bu, however Lü Bu did not come to his aid and Yang Feng was forced to flee to Liu Bei. Liu Bei invited him to a banquet, at which he was bound and killed.

Zhang Yan
Zhang Yan, originally Chu Yan, was the leader of a bandit group in the Taihang Mountains in 184. At some point he joined another bandit, Oxhorn Zhang, but Zhang was fatally wounded in a raid and died soon afterwards. His last act was to transfer his men over to Chu Yan, who took the name of Zhang to honor his patron. Zhang Yan went on to create a bandit confederacy known as the Black Mountain bandits that ravaged the neighboring commanderies of Changshan, Zhao, Zhongshan, Shangdang, and Henei. In 190 Zhang Yan had a loose alliance with Gongsun Zan against Yuan Shao. In 193 Yuan Shao attacked the Black Mountain bandits, forcing them off the southern hills and into the mountains. When Yuan Shao made his final attack on Gongsun Zan in 199, Zhang Yan tried to save him but failed. Zhang Yan surrendered to Cao Cao when he took over Ji Province in 205. He was made a general as well as a marquis.

Zheng Jiang
A woman bandit active in Dongping Commandery about 210. Apparently her appearance was foretold in a dream of Liu Zhen, one of Cao Cao's staff, where she was represented by a snake with four legs. She was defeated soon after. It is not clear in the text if she was a single person or two women named Zheng and Jiang.

Zu Lang
Zu Lang was a local leader who defeated Sun Ce in a skirmish in 194 and then driven into the southern hills by Wu Jing, Sun Ce's maternal uncle. He was eventually captured but Sun Ce showed him no ill will and recruited him into his staff.

Yellow Turbans
Zhang Rao, Guan Hai, He Man, He Yi, Huang Shao, Liu Pi, Xu He, and Sima Ju were leaders of the Yellow Turbans during the early 190s. They had substantial followings numbering in the tens of thousands.

In 192, Zhang Rao defeated Kong Rong's forces.

In 193, Guan Hai besieged Kong Rong but was defeated by Liu Bei.

In 196, Cao Cao took to the field against the other Yellow Turbans and defeated Huang Shao, after which He Man and He Yi surrendered.

In 200, Liu Pi supported Yuan Shao's invasion from the north by plundering the region around Cao Cao's headquarters at Xu city. He was later joined by Liu Bei, whom Yuan Shao sent to assist him, but they were defeated by Cao Ren. Liu Pi was killed.

In 206, Sima Ju and Xu He attacked a number of cities in Qing Province. Cao Cao sent Xiahou Yuan, Zang Ba, and Lü Qian with a large force to deal with them. After several engagements and heavy casualties on both sides, the two Yellow Turban rebels were killed.

Non-Han actors

Champa
The Cham people in Xianglin, the southernmost district of Rinan Commandery, broke away and became the Kingdom of Lâm Ấp (Champa) in 192.

In 248, Lâm Ấp seized Rinan Commandery. Due to the ensuing turmoil in Jiuzhen Commandery involving Lady Triệu, Eastern Wu was unable to retaliate.

Di
The Di (Five Barbarians) were a people related to the Qiang living in what is now Gansu Province. In 213, the Di kings Agui and Qianwan entered an alliance with Ma Chao. The next year Xiahou Yuan attacked their camp in Wudu Commandery and defeated them, killing Agui and forcing Qianwan to flee. Their people were resettled in Youfufeng Commandery. The Di went on to form three of the later Sixteen Kingdoms: Cheng Han (304-347), Former Qin (351-394) and Later Liang (386-403).

Goguryeo
The Korean kingdom of Goguryeo was invaded by Gongsun Kang in 204, resulting in the Daifang Commandery. In 208, Kang sent aid to Balgi in support of his claim to the Goguryeo throne, but was defeated by Gyesu, younger brother of Sansang of Goguryeo.  However some time later Kang invaded Goguryeo again and forced them to submit. Gongsun Kang took the capital of Goguryeo so that Goguryeo was forced to move its capital further east. Cao Wei also  invaded Goguryeo from 244 to 245. The Wei general Guanqiu Jian took the capital of Gungnae. The invasions, a retaliation against a Goguryeo raid in 242, destroyed the Goguryeo capital of Hwando, sent its king fleeing, and broke the tributary relationships between Goguryeo and the other tribes of Korea that formed much of Goguryeo's economy. Although the king evaded capture and eventually settled in a new capital, Goguryeo was reduced to such insignificance that for half a century there was no mention of the state in Chinese historical texts.

Nanman

Banshun and Zong

The Banshun, also known as the Bandun Man, which literally means "board shield barbarians", were a native people of Ba Commandery, Yi Province, who often served as elite troops in the Han army against other peoples such as the Qiang and the natives of Wuling Commandery. They rebelled in 179 due to unrest caused by the Yellow Turban Rebellion, but when amnesty was issued by Cao Qian in 182, the rebellion was ended. There was another brief uprising in 188 but it amounted to nothing. Related to the Banshun were the neighboring Zong people, who became interested in the mysticism of the Celestial Master Zhang Lu and moved north to the border of his territory. When Cao Cao attacked Zhang Lu in the summer of 215, he fled to Duhu of the Zong and Fuhu of the Banshun for refuge. However Duhu and Fuhu surrendered to Cao Cao in the autumn and received appointment, with Zhang Lu following in the winter. In 219 Liu Bei's officer Huang Quan attacked them and drove several non-Chinese groups north into Cao Cao's territory. The Zong therefore became known as the Di people from Ba.

Gaoding
Gaoding was a powerful chieftain in Yuexi Commandery. In 218 he led an attack on Jianwei Commandery but was repelled by the Administrator Li Yan. He caused trouble again in 223 and was killed in Zhuge Liang's Southern Campaign two years later.

Meng Huo

Meng Huo was a local leader of the Nanman mentioned in Annotations to Records of the Three Kingdoms by Pei Songzhi. In 225, Meng Huo rebelled with Yong Kai. He was captured by Zhuge Liang seven times before he surrendered. Meng Huo's role was greatly expanded upon in Romance of the Three Kingdoms, in which he is portrayed as the king of the Nanman and husband to Lady Zhurong, a descendant of the God of Fire. In the Romance, Meng Huo was described riding a red horse, wearing a golden inlaid headdress, a belt with a clasp in the image of a lion’s face, boots with pointed toes that were green, and a pair of swords chased with pine amber at his waist. Later he rode into battle on a red ox, wearing rhinoceros armour while wielding shield and sword. He enlisted the aid of his fellow kings Wutugu, who commanded an army of 30,000 invincible rattan armour troops, and Mulu, who rode a white elephant and deployed wild beasts in battle. Although his allies were defeated by Zhuge Liang's anachronistic gunpowder weapons and killed, Meng Huo was repeatedly captured and released until he surrendered and became a local administrator.

Yong Kai
Yong Kai was a powerful chieftain in Yizhou Commandery. In 215, Yong Kai killed the Administrator Zheng Ang and defected to Sun Quan. Sun Quan named Yong Kai Administrator of Yongchang Commandery but actually distrusted him and ordered his officers to keep him out of that territory. In 223, Yong Kai captured the Administrator Zhang Yi and sent him to Sun Quan. In 225, Yong Kai was killed by another chieftain, Gao Ding.

Shanyue
The Shanyue "Mountain Yue" were a group of Austro-Asiatic people related to the Vietnamese who lived in the mountain regions of modern Jiangsu, Zhejiang, Anhui, Jiangxi and Fujian. In 203, they rebelled against Sun Quan's rule and were defeated by the generals Lü Fan, Cheng Pu, and Taishi Ci. In 217, Sun Quan appointed Lu Xun supreme commander of an army to suppress martial activities by the Shanyue in Guiji (modern Shaoxing). Captured Shanyue tribesmen were recruited into the army. In 234, Zhuge Ke was made governor of Danyang. Under his governorship, the region was cleansed of the Shanyue through systematic destruction of their settlements. Captured tribesmen were used as front line fodder in the army. The remaining population was resettled in lowlands and many became tenant farmers for Chinese landowners.

Vietnamese
During the early phase of the Three Kingdoms era, there was a unrest across the Jiaozhi circuit (modern-day Guangdong, Guangxi and northern Vietnam) led by the Wuhu chief Liang Long and his rebellion attracted the Lac Viet and all other ethnic groups in Southern Han China, but was suppressed in 184. After a century and a half of close imperial supervision and repression, Jiaozhi and Jiuzhen enjoyed a period of autonomy from 187 to 226. In 177 Shi Xie became the prefect of Jiaozhi (Jiaozhou (modern Vietnam and Guangzhou)), is primarily remembered today in Vietnam as Sĩ Nhiếp, the father of education and a great patron of Buddhism. He relocated Jiaozhi’s capital back to Luy Lâu, the river market town Zhao Tuo had founded in 179 BC, which soon became celebrated for its trading prosperity. Shi Xie stayed out of the northern wars for the most part and later willingly submitted to Eastern Wu. According to Stephen O'Harrow, Shi Xie was essentially "the first Vietnamese." Buddhism became the predominant religion the Lac people. During Shi Xie's reign, the Lac people's customs had been slightly altered and sinicized by Xie.

The south’s trade and treasure attracted imperial power. After Shi Xie’s death in 226, the Wu court at Nanjing reasserted direct Chinese control over Jiaozhi. An army of three thousand set out from Nanhai Commandery and sailed up the Red River. The Wu general summoned Xie’s son, Shi Hui, with his five brothers and sons, and beheaded them all. Having conquered Jiaozhi, Wu forces also stormed Jiuzhen, killing or capturing ten thousand people, along with surviving members of Shi Xie’s family In 231, the Wu court had to send another general to Jiuzhen to “exterminate and pacify the barbarous Yuè” there. In 248, the people of Jiaozhi and Jiuzhen commanderies rebelled. A Lạc Việt woman named Lady Triệu in Jiuzhen led a rebellion, followed by a hundred Lac chieftains led fifty thousand families in her revolt. Eastern Wu sent Lu Yin to deal with the rebels. He defeated her and put her to death.

In 255–56, the Vietnamese monk Đạo Thanh coauthored one of the first translations of the Mahayana sutra entitled The Saddharmapandarika (V. Pháp Hoa Tam Muội), or Lotus of Good Faith.

In 263, Viet "barbarians" people in Jiaozhi and Jiuzhen under Lã Hưng one again revolted against the Wu dynasty. The rebels handed the region over to Wu’s rival, the northern Chinese kingdom of Jin. In 268 and 269, they held off large Wu armies and fleets, which eventually retook Jiaozhi’s ports and main towns in 271. Fighting continued in the countryside until 280, when Jin destroyed Wu, reunifying China.

Wuhuan
The Wuhuan, a people similar to the Xianbei, were a loose confederation of nomads that had been subservient to larger and stronger neighboring powers for most of their existence. In 168 the Wuhuan established some degree of independence under their own leaders. The largest of these groups were led by Nanlou in Shanggu, Qiuliju in Liaoxi, Supuyan in the Dependent State of Liaodong, and Wuyan in Youbeiping. In 187 Qiuliju joined the rebellion of Zhang Chun. Following the defeat of Zhang Chun in 188, Qiuliju attacked Gongsun Zan but was defeated. In 190 he surrendered to Liu Yu and died in 193. Qiuliju's son Louban was too young to succeed him so his cousin Tadun became acting guardian. In 195 Tadun, Nanlou and Supuyan supported Yuan Shao against Gongsun Zan. In 207 Tadun was defeated by Cao Cao at the Battle of White Wolf Mountain and died in battle. After their defeat many of the Wuhuan surrendered to Cao Cao and served as part of Cao Cao's cavalry forces. Louban and Supuyan fled to Gongsun Kang, who killed them.

Cao Cao divided the Wuhuan into three groups situated in Dai Commandery. The chieftains Nengchendi and Pufulu continued to cause trouble until 218 when Cao Zhang destroyed the last remnants of their power for good.

Wuqi
The Wuqi "Five Gorges" barbarians were a mountain people who lived in Wuling Commandery. In 221, Liu Bei bribed their leader Shamoke into supporting his war against Sun Quan, however the invasion failed and Shamoke was killed in a counterattack by Lu Xun the following year.

Xianbei

The Xianbei killed the Northern Xiongnu chanyu Youliu in 87 and rose to power in the wake of the Northern Chanyu's defeat by the Han at the Battle of the Altai Mountains in 89. The loose Xianbei confederacy lacked the organization of the Xiongnu but was highly aggressive until the death of their khan Tanshihuai in 182. Tanshihuai's son Helian lacked his father's abilities and was killed in a raid on Beidi in 186. Helian's brother Kuitou succeeded him, but when Helian's son Qianman came of age, he challenged his uncle to succession, destroying the last vestiges of unity among the Xianbei. By 190, the Xianbei had split into three groups with Kuitou ruling in Inner Mongolia, Kebineng (軻比能) in northern Shanxi, and Suli (素利) and Mijia in northern Liaodong. In 205, Kuitou's brothers Budugen and Fuluohan succeeded him. After Cao Cao defeated the Wuhuan at the Battle of White Wolf Mountain in 207, Budugen and Fuluohan paid tribute to him. In 218, Fuluohan met with the Wuhuan chieftain Nengchendi to form an alliance, but Nengchendi double crossed him and called in another Xianbei khan, Kebineng, who killed Fuluohan. Budugen went to the court of Cao Wei in 224 to ask for assistance against Kebineng, but he eventually betrayed them and allied with Kebineng in 233. Kebineng killed Budugen soon afterwards.

Kebineng was from a minor Xianbei tribe. He rose to power west of Dai Commandery by taking in a number of Chinese refugees, who helped him drill his soldiers and make weapons. After the defeat of the Wuhuan in 207, he also sent tribute to Cao Cao, and even provided assistance against the rebel Tian Yin. In 218 he allied himself to the Wuhuan rebel Nengchendi but they were heavily defeated and forced back across the frontier by Cao Zhang. In 220 he acknowledged Cao Pi as emperor of Cao Wei. Eventually he turned on the Wei for frustrating his advances on another Xianbei khan, Sui. Kebineng conducted raids on Cao Wei before he was killed in 235, after which his confederacy disintegrated.

Many of the Xianbei tribes migrated south and settled on the borders of the Wei-Jin dynasties. In 258 Tuoba Liwei's people settled in Yanmen Commandery. The Yuwen tribe settled between the Luan River and Liucheng. The Murong and Duan tribes became vassals of the Sima clan. An offshoot of the Murong tribe moved west into northern Qinghai and mixed with the native Qiang people, becoming Tuyuhun.

The Xianbei went on to found five of the short lived Sixteen Kingdoms: Former Yan (337–370), Later Yan (384–409), Western Qin (385–431), Southern Liang (397–414), and Southern Yan (398–410), as well as one of the Northern and Southern dynasties: Northern Wei (386–535).

Xiongnu

By the time of the Three Kingdoms period the Xiongnu had already ceased to be a major power. Their last stand as a steppe empire was in 89 when Dou Xian led an army of 45,000 and decisively defeated them at the Battle of the Altai Mountains. The Xiongnu Empire was replaced by a loose confederation of disorganized Xianbei tribes, who were nonetheless highly aggressive and proved problematic to their southern neighbors. A southern branch of the Xiongnu split off from their northern neighbors in 50 AD and continued to exist as a Han puppet state in Bing Province. However, in 188 the Xiuchuge clan rebelled against their chanyu, Qiangqu, for sending troops to aid the Han against the rebels Zhang Ju and Zhang Chun. They replaced Qiangqu with his son Yufuluo, whose hold on power was tenuous, and he was ousted over a marquis of the Xubu clan. When the marquis of Xubu died the next year an elderly king became the nominal head of state without the title of Chanyu and the Southern Xiongnu ceased to exist as a coherent entity. In 216 the Xiongnu of the Ordos were settled but the region remained outside the jurisdiction of Cao Wei's administration.

Yufuluo fled to the Han court but found no support after the death of Emperor Ling of Han in 189. He became a wandering mercenary and died in 194. Yufuluo's brother Huchuquan attempted to regain his position as chanyu of the Southern Xiongnu but was driven back by the same rebels. He came to serve under Yuan Shang in 202 and was defeated by Cao Cao's officer Zhong Yao, after which he surrendered. The last vestiges of the Xiongnu were split into five divisions and settled in Taiyuan Commandery under the supervision of Yufuluo's sons Liu Bao and Liu Qubei.

The Xiongnu went on to found three of the short lived Sixteen Kingdoms: Former Zhao (304–329), Northern Liang (397–439), and Xia (407–431). Later Zhao (319–351) was also founded by one of the 19 Southern Xiongnu tribes, but was of Yuezhi descent.

Campaigns and battles

184–220

220–280

References

Bibliography

Sources
 Sanguozhi
 Zizhi Tongjian
 Weilüe

See also
 Military history of China (pre-1911)

Military history of Imperial China
Three Kingdoms